Stephan Hansen Stephanius (July 23, 1599 – April 22, 1650) was a Danish historian and philologist.
His name is sometimes fully Latinized as "Stephanus Johannis Stephanius"

Biography 
He was born in Copenhagen, Denmark-Norway. He attended Sorø Academy where his father Hans Stephensen (1561-1625) was a professor and superintendent. He later  transferred to  Herlufsholm School. He studied at the University of Copenhagen where in 1618 he took the Philosophical Baccalaureus. He subsequently  studied at the University of Rostock and University of Leiden.  After returning he became rector of Slangerup in 1625 and received his Master's Degree at the University of  Copenhagen. In 1639, he became a professor at Sorø Academy and was appointed Royal historiographer. 

He published a Latin edition of  Svenonis Aggonis filii, qvæ extant, opuscula in 1642.  Gesta Danorum was published in 1645 titled Saxonis Grammatici Historiæ Danicæ Libri XVI.
His notes on the Greek lexicon of Hesychius are included in the edition of that work by Joannes Alberti (Lugd. Bat. 1746); see the Praefatio p. XXXIV. His  book collection is now incorporated into the National Library of Sweden in Stockholm.

References

1599 births
1650 deaths
17th-century Danish historians
Danish educators
People from Copenhagen
University of Copenhagen alumni
17th-century Danish philologists